George Robison Black (March 24, 1835 – November 3, 1886) was an American slave owner, politician and lawyer. His wife, Nellie Peters Black, became a prominent social activist.

Biography
Black was born at his family's slave plantation near Jacksonboro, Georgia as the son of Edward Junius Black and Augusta George Anna Kirkland Black. He attended the University of Georgia (UGA) in Athens and the University of South Carolina in Columbia. He studied law, was admitted to the bar in 1857 and began practice in Savannah, Georgia.

During the American Civil War, Black  served in the Confederate States Army as a first lieutenant in the Phoenix Riflemen and later as a lieutenant colonel of the Sixty-third Georgia Regiment.

After the war, Black participated in the Georgia constitutional convention in 1865 and was a delegate to the 1872 Democratic National Convention. He later served as state Senator from 1875 to 1877 and was the vice president of the Georgia State Agricultural Society. Black was elected to the United States House of Representatives in 1880 as a Democrat in the 47th Congress; however, he lost his reelection campaign in 1882. He died in Sylvania, Georgia, in 1886 and was buried in Sylvania Cemetery.

References

Sources

 Retrieved on April 14, 2009

1835 births
1886 deaths
People from Screven County, Georgia
American people of Scottish descent
Democratic Party members of the United States House of Representatives from Georgia (U.S. state)
Democratic Party Georgia (U.S. state) state senators
19th-century American politicians
Georgia (U.S. state) lawyers
University of Georgia people
People of Georgia (U.S. state) in the American Civil War
Confederate States Army officers
19th-century American lawyers